The 2021 UConn Huskies baseball team represented the University of Connecticut in the 2021 NCAA Division I baseball season.  The Huskies played their home games at Elliot Ballpark, their brand new stadium on campus in Storrs, Connecticut.  The team is coached by Jim Penders, in his 18th season at UConn.  The Huskies played their first season back in the Big East Conference, having departed the American Athletic Conference.  They finished in first place with a 13–4 record, won the Big East Tournament for the 4th time in program history, and made their 22nd appearance in an NCAA Regional.

Previous season
The Huskies posted an overall record of 8–5 in the Covid-19-shortened 2020 season.  The season was canceled before they could open Elliot Ballpark, and so will inaugurate it in 2021.

Personnel

Roster

Coaches

Schedule

References

UConn
UConn
UConn
Big East Conference baseball champion seasons
UConn Huskies baseball seasons